Greatest Hits Live 2003 is a live album by the Canadian rock band April Wine, released in 2003.

Track listing
All tracks written by Myles Goodwyn unless otherwise noted.
 "Oowatanite" (J. Clench) – 4:57
 "Wanna Rock" – 2:40
 "The Band Has Just Begun" (M. Goodwyn, J. Clench) – 4:14
 "Say Hello" – 3:42
 "Enough is Enough" – 3:20
 "Before the Dawn" (B. Greenway) – 5:06
 "Sign of the Gypsy Queen" (Lorence Hud) – 6:18
 "Tonite is a Wonderful Time to Fall in Love" – 3:49
 "Cum Hear the Band" – 3:53
 "Won't Go There" – 3:30
 "Victim for Your Love" – 4:31
 "Weeping Widow" (Robert Wright, AKA. Art La King) – 7:11
 "21st Century Schizoid Man" (R. Fripp, M. Giles, G. Lake, I. McDonald, P. Sinfield) – 12:44
 "Like a Lover, Like a Song" – 5:18
 "Rock n' Roll is a Vicious Game" – 4:17
 "Holiday" (B. Greenway) – 4:12
 "Bad Side of the Moon" (Elton John, Bernie Taupin) – 3:09
 "All Over Town" – 3:26
 "Roller" – 5:02
 "Just Between You and Me" – 4:26
 "I Like to Rock" – 5:20
 "That's Who I Am, This is What I Do" – 2:45 – previously unreleased studio track
 "Strong Silent Type" – 5:34 – previously unreleased studio track

Personnel
 Myles Goodwyn – lead & background vocals, guitar
 Brian Greenway – vocals, guitars
 Jim Clench – vocals, bass
 Jerry Mercer – drums, background vocals
 Carl Dixon – guitar, keyboards

References

April Wine albums
2003 greatest hits albums
2003 live albums
MCA Records live albums